Tusculum is a historic plantation house located near Arcola, Warren County, North Carolina.  It was built about 1835, and is a two-story, five bay, late Federal style frame dwelling.  It has a gable roof, is sheathed in weatherboard, and has later shed roof porch. The front facade features a Palladian doorway with paneled pilasters and fanlight.

It was listed on the National Register of Historic Places in 1974.

References

Plantation houses in North Carolina
Houses on the National Register of Historic Places in North Carolina
Federal architecture in North Carolina
Houses completed in 1835
Houses in Warren County, North Carolina
National Register of Historic Places in Warren County, North Carolina